John Martin Leahy (May 16, 1886 – March 26, 1967) was an American short story writer, novelist and artist. He wrote  and illustrated weird stories that appeared in pulp magazines such as Weird Tales and Science and Invention. His novel, Drome was published by Fantasy Publishing Company, Inc. in 1952.

His short story "In Amundsen’s Tent" (1928) is a precoursor of both H. P. Lovecraft’s "At the Mountains of Madness" and John W. Campbell, Jr.’s "Who Goes There?".

References

Sources

External links

1886 births
1967 deaths
20th-century American novelists
20th-century American painters
American male painters
American fantasy writers
American horror writers
American male novelists
American illustrators
Novelists from Washington (state)
American male short story writers
20th-century American short story writers
20th-century American male writers
People from Newcastle, Washington
20th-century American male artists